The 15909 / 15910 Avadh Assam Express is an Express train belonging to Indian Railways – Northeast Frontier Railway zone that runs between Dibrugarh railway station of Dibrugarh, Assam and Lalgarh Junction of Bikaner,  Rajasthan in India. 

The train is often delayed due to its lengthy route.

It operates as train number 15909 from Dibrugarh to Lalgarh Junction and as train number 15910 in the reverse direction, serving the nine states of Assam, Nagaland, West Bengal, Bihar, Uttar Pradesh, Delhi, Haryana, Punjab and Rajasthan.

A metre-gauge train from Lucknow to Guwahati Awadh Tirhoot Mail used to run until gauge conversion took place and the BG Avadh Assam Express was started in late 1980s.
Agra Fort to Guwahati Vaishali MG Express (via Silliguri), Kathgodam to Tinsukia MG Express and Lucknow–Guwahati MG Express were long-distance trains on MG in Lucknow.

Coaches

The 15909/15910 Avadh Assam Express presently has 1 First AC Cum 2 Tier, 1 AC 2 Tier, 3 AC 3 Tier, 11 Sleeper Class, 3 General Unreserved & 2 EOG (Generator cum Luggage Van) coaches. In addition, it carries a pantry car & up to 1 High Capacity Parcel Vans.

As is customary with most train services in India, Coach Composition may be amended at the discretion of Indian Railways depending on demand.

COACH COMPOSITION -

Service

The 05909 Avadh Assam Express covers the distance of 3118 kilometres in almost 68 hours [] & in 68 hours as 05910 Avadh Assam Express [].

As the average speed of the train is below , as per Indian Railways rules, its fare does not include a superfast surcharge.

Routeing

The 15909 Avadh Assam Express runs from 

ASSAM
 

Bhojo

Sarupathar

Kampur

Jagiroad

NAGALAND
Dimapur

WEST BENGAL

New Cooch Behar

New Jalpaiguri (Siliguri)

BIHAR
Kishanganj

Katihar

 Thana Bihpur
 
 
 
Barauni
Dalsinghsarai
Samastipur
Muzaffarpur
Hajipur
Chhapra
Siwan
Mairwa

UTTAR PRADESH
Bhatpar Rani
Bhatni

Gorakhpur

Basti

Gonda

Lucknow Charbagh
Balamau

Bareilly

Moradabad

Pilkhuwa
Ghaziabad

DELHI
Delhi Junction

HARYANA
Bahadurgarh
Rohtak

Narwana
Tohana
Jakhal Mandi
Mandi Dabwali

PUNJAB
Bareta
Budhlada

Maur Mandi
Bathinda Junction

RAJASTHAN
Sangaria
Hanumangarh

Suratgarh 
Lunkaransar
Lalgarh Junction.

Direction reversal
It reverses direction of travel once at; 
 Bathinda Junction.

Traction

Due to partial electrification of the route, a total of 3 locomotives are assigned to this train.

First this train is hauled by WDP 4 / WDP 4B / WDP 4D locomotive of Diesel Loco Shed, Siliguri  from Dibrugarh up to  handing over to an Electric Loco Shed, Ghaziabad based WAP 7 locomotive which hauls the train up to Bathinda Junction following which a Bhagat Ki Kothi based WDP 4 / WDP 4B / WDP 4D locomotive powers the train for the remainder of its journey until Lalgarh Junction.

Incidents
In 1999, the infamous Gaisal train disaster occurred between Avadh Assam Express and Brahmaputra Mail at Gaisal railway station near Kishanganj railway station.

Timings

 05909 Avadh Assam Express leaves Dibrugarh on a daily basis at 10:20 hrs IST and reaches Lalgarh Junction at 04:10 hrs IST on the 4th day.
 05910 Avadh Assam Express leaves Lalgarh Junction on a daily basis at 19:50 hrs IST and reaches Dibrugarh at 15:35 hrs IST on the 4th day.

See also

 Gaisal train disaster

References

External links

Transport in Dibrugarh
Transport in Bikaner
Express trains in India
Rail transport in Assam
Rail transport in Nagaland
Rail transport in West Bengal
Rail transport in Bihar
Rail transport in Uttar Pradesh
Rail transport in Delhi
Rail transport in Haryana
Rail transport in Rajasthan
Named passenger trains of India